Flaming Guns of the Purple Sage is a sadistic satirical play by Jane Martin.

Synopsis
Big 8, a rodeo competitor, is facing foreclosure on the Wyoming ranch where she rehabilitates injured rodeo cowboys. The arrival of a shocking woman named Shedevil and a one eyed Ukrainian biker named Black Dog leads to violence and horror in a satire on the cowboy mentality of pulp western writers like Zane Grey.

References

External links
 List of Jane Martin plays

Plays by Jane Martin
Satirical plays
Plays set in Wyoming
2001 plays